Frederick Marc Trickey (born 16 August 1935) was an Anglican priest in the late 20th and early 21st centuries.

He was educated at Bristol Grammar School and Durham University and ordained in 1965. After a curacy at the Church of St Lawrence, Alton he was Rector of St John with Winnall from 1968 to 1977.  He was Rector of St Martin de la Bellouse, Guernsey from 1977 to 2002, Dean of Guernsey from 1995 to 2003 and Priest in charge of Sark from 1996 to 2003.

References

1935 births
People educated at Bristol Grammar School
Alumni of Durham University
Guernsey Anglicans
Church of England deans
Deans of Guernsey
Living people